Okuyama Dam is an earthfill dam located in Shiga prefecture in Japan. The dam is used for irrigation. The catchment area of the dam is 3.4 km2. The dam impounds about 10  ha of land when full and can store 727 thousand cubic meters of water. The construction of the dam was started on 1963 and completed in 1971.

References

Dams in Shiga Prefecture
1971 establishments in Japan